Devin Vega (born December 11, 1998) is a footballer who plays as an attacking midfielder. Born in the mainland United States, he represents the Puerto Rico national team.

Career
Vega grew up in San Antonio, Texas and played his youth career at the U.S. Soccer Federation's residency program and the FC Dallas Academy.

Vega signed with San Antonio FC on January 26, 2017. Vega scored his first professional goal on Tuesday April 25, 2017 against Seattle Sounders FC 2, slotting the ball into the back of the net in the 69th minute.

Vega signed with Phoenix Rising FC on December 13, 2017 for the 2018 season. Vega scored a goal against his old team in Phoenix's 4–0 win over San Antonio in 2018.

International career
Vega played for the United States national under-17 team in 2014 at the Aegean Cup. However, he was also eligible to play for the Puerto Rico national team and was called up in August 2019 for friendly matches. He made his debut in an exhibition match against Hartford Athletic. He was later called up in September for matches against Honduras and Guatemala.

International goals
Scores and results Puerto Rico's goal tally first.

References

External links

1998 births
Living people
Puerto Rican footballers
Puerto Rico international footballers
American soccer players
American people of Puerto Rican descent
San Antonio FC players
Phoenix Rising FC players
FC Tucson players
USL Championship players
Soccer players from San Antonio
Association football midfielders
USL League One players
Real Monarchs players